The Sunrisers Hyderabad (often abbreviated as SRH) are a franchise cricket team based in Hyderabad, Telangana, that compete in the Indian Premier League (IPL). The team is owned by Kalanithi Maran of the Sun TV Network who won the bid for the franchise at 850.5 million per year on a five-year deal in 2012 following the termination of the previous Hyderabad-based franchise, Deccan Chargers, from the IPL. Having made its first IPL playoffs appearance in its debut season in 2013, the team has qualified for the playoffs every year since the 2016 season. They have reached the finals twice, most recently during the 2018 season, and won their only title in the 2016 season after defeating the Royal Challengers Bangalore by 8 runs in the Final.

, the team was captained by Kane Williamson and coached by Tom Moody with Simon Helmot as assistant coach, Muttiah Muralitharan and Dale Steyn as bowling coaches, Brian Lara as batting coach and Hemang Badani as fielding coach. The team has played its home matches in the 55,000-capacity Rajiv Gandhi International Cricket Stadium in Hyderabad since its inception. The coronavirus pandemic impacted the brand value of the Sunrisers Hyderabad which was estimated to be 57.4million in 2020 as the overall brand of IPL was decreased to 4.4billion, according to Brand Finance.

Bhuvneshwar Kumar has the most appearances for the SRH with 115 matches while David Warner is the team's current leading run scorer with 4,014 runs. Shikhar Dhawan, Williamson and Warner are the only batsmen to have scored more than 2,000 runs in total for the team, while Jonny Bairstow and Manish Pandey are the only other batsmen to cross the 1,000-run mark. Warner has the highest batting average at 49.55 and Rahul Tripathi has the highest strike rate at 158.23 respectively among players who faced more than 250 balls. Warner scored the most runs in a single match for the SRH, with a knock of 126 runs off 59 balls while Warner and Bairstow are the only centurions for the team. In bowling, Kumar is the team's leading wicket-taker with 130 wickets to his name. Kumar and Umran Malik are the only bowlers to take a five-wicket haul for the SRH. Jason Holder has the best bowling average (16.61) among the players who have bowled more than 20 overs. Holder also has the lowest bowling strike rate for the team while Rashid Khan has the best economy rate at 12.10 and 6.33 respectively among the players who bowled over 20 overs. Amit Mishra is the only SRH bowler to claim a hat-trick. In fielding, Warner has taken the most catches for the team (46) while Naman Ojha has effected 38 dismissals, the highest behind the wickets for the team, including 36 catches and 2 stumpings.

Players
Key
  – Member of the current squad
  – Captain
  – Wicket-keeper
 First – Year of Twenty20 debut for the SRH
 Last – Year of latest Twenty20 match for the SRH
 * – Batsman remained not out

 Last updated: 15 November 2022

Captains

The Sunrisers Hyderabad announced Kumar Sangakkara as the captain for their first IPL campaign but had to replace him with Cameron White during the season owing to the former's poor form. Shikhar Dhawan was made the captain during the 2013 Champions League Twenty20 and also led the team initially during the 2014 IPL season. Dhawan was eventually replaced by Darren Sammy during the season to relieve Dhawan from the captaincy pressure and improve his batting performances. They changed their captain for the fifth time in three seasons appointing David Warner for the 2015 season who proved to be their most successful captain by winning their first IPL title in the 2016 season. Warner resigned as the captain in the aftermath of a ball-tampering scandal before the 2018 season and was replaced by Kane Williamson. Bhuvneshwar Kumar stood-in as the captain at the start of the 2019 season when Williamson was unavailable owing to an injury. Warner was reinstated as the captain of the Sunrisers replacing Williamson ahead of the 2020 season but Warner's lack of form led Williamson to be reinstated as captain during the 2021 season. Manish Pandey captained last match of the 2021 season with Warner, Williamson and Kumar rested for that match. Williamson continued as the captain for the 2022 season except for the last match which he missed due to the personal issues in which Kumar stood-in as the captain.

 Last updated: 15 November 2022

See also
Sunrisers Hyderabad
List of Sunrisers Hyderabad records

Notes

Footnotes

References

External links
Sunrisers Hyderabad official website

Sunrisers Hyderabad seasons
Cricket in Hyderabad, India
Sunrisers Hyderabad